Mark Anthony Gozar Andaya (born March 22, 1981) is a Filipino professional basketball player and actor who last played for Pasig Pirates of the Maharlika Pilipinas Basketball League (MPBL). He was drafted eighth overall by Talk 'N Text in the 2006 PBA draft. After playing for the Philippine Patriots in the ASEAN Basketball League, he was acquired by the Barako Bull Energy Boosters. He also had a brief stint with the Misamis Oriental Meteors in the Liga Pilipinas.

Filmography

Television

Film

PBA career statistics

Season-by-season averages

|-
| align=left | 
| align=left | Talk 'N Text / Air21
| 31 || 6.1 || .542 || .000 || .625 || 1.0 || .2 || .1 || .1 || 2.0
|-
| align=left | 
| align=left | Red Bull
| 13 || 6.1 || .400 || .000 || .333 || 2.1 || .5|| .0 || .4 || 2.7
|-
| align=left | 
| align=left | Rain or Shine
| 21 || 5.6 || .531 || .000 || .429 || 1.8 || .2 || .1 || .4 || 1.9
|-
| align=left | 
| align=left | Barako Bull
| 13 || 13.2 || .471 || .000 || .632 || 3.6 || .2 || .1 || 1.6 || 3.4
|-
| align=left | 
| align=left | Barako Bull
| 2 || 3.0 || .500 || .000 || .000 || .5 || .0 || .0 || .0 || 1.0
|-
| align=left | 
| align=left | Air21
| 2 || 4.0 || .667 || .000 || .000 || .5 || .0 || .0 || .0 || 2.0
|-
| align=left | Career
| align=left | 
| 82 || 7.0 || .491 || .000 || .534 || 1.8 || .2 || .1 || .5 || 2.3

References

External links
 Player Profile at PBA-Online!
 

1981 births
Living people
Air21 Express players
Barako Bull Energy players
Barako Bull Energy Boosters players
Centers (basketball)
Letran Knights basketball players
Philippine Patriots players
Philippines men's national basketball team players
Filipino men's basketball players
Rain or Shine Elasto Painters players
Basketball players from Manila
TNT Tropang Giga players
Maharlika Pilipinas Basketball League players
TNT Tropang Giga draft picks